Early Spring can refer to:

 Early Spring (1956 film), a Japanese film
 Early Spring (1959 film), a South Korean film featuring Kang Hyo-shil
 Early Spring (1986 film), a Danish film
 Early Spring (painting), a hanging scroll painting by Guo Xi, completed in 1072

See also
 Spring (disambiguation)